William Morgan (1545 – 10 September 1604) was a Welsh Bishop of Llandaff and of St Asaph, and the translator of the first version of the whole Bible into Welsh from Greek and Hebrew.

Life
Morgan was born in 1545 at Tŷ Mawr Wybrnant, in the parish of Penmachno, near Betws-y-Coed, North Wales (there is some doubt about the exact year of his birth, his memorial in Cambridge, for example, gives 1541). As his father was a tenant of the Gwydir estate, he was probably educated at Gwydir Castle, near Llanrwst, along with the children of the Wynn family. Morgan then attended St John's College, Cambridge, where he studied a range of subjects including philosophy, mathematics and Greek.  He graduated BA in 1568 and MA in 1571, before seven years of Biblical studies, including a study of the Bible in Greek, Hebrew and Aramaic and the works of the Church Fathers and contemporary Protestant theologians.  He graduated BD in 1578 and DD in 1583. At Cambridge he was a contemporary of the Welsh poet Edmwnd Prys, who later assisted Morgan with his translation of the Bible.

In addition to his scholarly pursuits, Morgan was a clergyman of the Church of England, having been ordained in 1568 by the Bishop of Ely.  His first clerical benefice was the parish of Llanbadarn Fawr, which he gained in 1572; in 1575 he moved to Welshpool, and then became vicar of Llanrhaeadr-ym-Mochnant in 1578, where he made his Bible translation. In 1579 he became rector of Llanfyllin, which he held concurrently with being vicar of nearby Llanrhaeadr-ym-Mochnant.

Morgan was still at Cambridge when William Salesbury published his Welsh New Testament in 1567. While he was pleased that this work was available, Morgan firmly believed in the importance of having the Old Testament translated into Welsh as well. He began work on his own translation of the Old Testament in the early 1580s and published this, together with a revision of Salesbury's New Testament, in 1588.

Following the publication of his Bible, Morgan worked on a revision of the Book of Common Prayer (which had also been translated by Salesbury), published in 1599.  He also began work on a revision of the 1588 Bible, which contained a number of printing errors. This work was continued after Morgan's death by bishop Richard Parry and scholar John Davies, and a revised version of the Bible was published in 1620. This edition is still known as William Morgan's translation, and it is this rather than the previous edition which became the standard Welsh Bible until the 20th century and continues to be used to this day. His achievement is now looked on as a major monument in the history of the Welsh language; it meant that the Welsh people could read the Bible in their first language at roughly the same time as their English neighbours had the privilege.

William Morgan was appointed Bishop of Llandaff in 1595 and was translated to the bishopric of St Asaph in 1601.  He died on 10 September 1604.

Family
He married twice, first to Ellen Salesbury, before going to Cambridge, and later to Catherine, daughter of George ap Richard ap John. He had one son, Evan, who became vicar of his father's old parish of Llanrhaeadr-ym-Mochnant.

Memorials and commemorations
Morgan's birthplace Tŷ Mawr Wybrnant is preserved by the National Trust as a historic house museum.

A slate plaque close to the gates of the parish church of St Dogfan in Llanrhaeadr-ym-Mochnant commemorates Morgan. It was while at this church that he made his historic translations.

There is a memorial in St John's College Chapel, Cambridge, where Morgan was a student.

In 2019 it was announced that the new office building for the UK Government in Central Square, Cardiff, was to be named 'Tŷ William Morgan - William Morgan House', in Morgan's honour.

See also 
Y Beibl cyssegr-lan
Welsh Bible

Notes

References

Sources

External links 

 William Morgan Bible on-line
 Images of the entire 1588 Bible

1545 births
1604 deaths
Alumni of St John's College, Cambridge
Bishops of Llandaff
Bishops of St Asaph
Doctors of Divinity
Translators of the Bible into Welsh
Welsh translators
16th-century Welsh writers
16th-century male writers
People from Penmachno
Bro Machno
16th-century Welsh Anglican bishops
17th-century Welsh Anglican bishops
Anglican biblical scholars
British biblical scholars
16th-century Anglican theologians
17th-century Anglican theologians